ND2 is the name for a Romanian diesel-electric locomotive, produced by Electroputere, exported to and employed in China by China Railway. It was made for the purpose of heavy transport.

History
ND2 is a derivative of LDE2100 (060DA) locomotive. The Chinese Ministry of Railways started importing this locomotive in 1974 under a barter arrangement to fill a gap in the domestic locomotive production.

Most of the class were based at Shanghai Bureau, with some others working as far south as Guangzhou. At its apex, ND2 class was the predominant passenger power south of Yangtze River.

Rated at 2300 hp UIC, ND2 traces its lineage back to a Swiss design created by SLM and Sulzer. Externally, ND2 bears resemblance to Ae 6/6 Swiss electric locomotives.

Production

A total number of 284 ND2 locomotives were produced. The ND2s are now being withdrawn but a few were exported back to Romania.

Romanian private freight operator GFR now operates a few ND2 locomotives that were exported back to Romania, repainted and had their couplers changed.

References

External links
 Railways of China
  a history of ND2, Sulzer and its Swiss lineage

ND2
Co-Co locomotives
Electroputere locomotives
Railway locomotives introduced in 1972
Standard gauge locomotives of China